Sainte-Geneviève-des-Bois (often abbreviated to SGdB) is a commune in the southern suburbs of Paris, France. It is located 23.5 km (14.6 miles) from the center of Paris, in the arrondissement of Palaiseau, Essonne department, Île-de-France.

History
Inhabitants of Sainte-Geneviève-des-Bois are known as Génovéfains. There has been a settlement in what is now Sainte-Geneviève-des-Bois since Roman times. In 1800 it was still a small settlement with around 100 inhabitants. After the armistice in 1918 the population was counted at less than 800. The boom started in the 1920s when inhabitants of Paris wanted affordable housing. This boom was in part because the railway station of Perray was built, connecting the town to Paris. The population at the moment is over 30.000 inhabitants, making it one of the larger settlements in the Essonne departement.

In 1926 the Château de la Cossonnerie was converted to a retirement home for White émigrés. It is locally known as the Maison Russe. It is still a retirement home but also a centre for Russian Culture.

Population

Notable events
In 1963 Carrefour opened its first hypermarket in Sainte-Geneviève-des-Bois, at more than 2 500 square meters the largest in France at the time. This store is still active.

Ilan Halimi, the young French Jew, who was kidnapped and tortured (leading to his eventual death) in 2006 by a group called the Gang of Barbarians, was found in Sainte-Geneviève-des-Bois.

Tourism
Saint-Geneviève-des-Bois does not have an Office du Tourisme nor does the Mairie have tourist facilities. The town has set out a walking tour of the town taking in most of the important places in the town, taking in both the old and the new. Saint-Geneviève-des-Bois has a strong link with the Russian community living in France. The walk passes the Russian Necropolis, considered by some as the most important necropolis of Russian emigrants in the world.

The town offers limited cycling, horse-riding and walking facilities. There is a campsite in neighbouring Villiers-sur-Orge.

Sights
Attractions include the Donjon, a park with animals, the town greenhouse, a grotto, and a Russian Necropolis. There are two main green spaces, the Bois des Trous and a parkland which borders on the river Orge (a tributary of the Seine). There are also some small parks.

Location
Sainte-Geneviève-des-Bois is one of the southern suburbs (banlieue) of Paris, France.

Transport
Sainte-Geneviève-des-Bois has an eponymous railway station located on the Paris–Bordeaux railway and the Transilien which in part serves RER line C to Paris.

From the railway station a number of bus lines connect the town to the region: lines CEAT (101, 102, 103, 104 and 105), Daniel Meyer (DM6A and DM17A)

Sport
See Sainte-Geneviève Sports

Gallery

Twin towns - sister cities
Sainte-Geneviève-des-Bois is twinned with:
 Mikołów, Poland
 Obertshausen, Germany
 Penafiel, Portugal

See also
 Communes of the Essonne department

References

External links
 
  Official website 
 
  The UME (Union des Maires de l'Essonne) website

Communes of Essonne